Distinctive Software Inc. (DSI) was a Canadian video game developer established in Burnaby, British Columbia, by Don Mattrick and Jeff Sember after their success with the game Evolution. Mattrick (age 17) and Jeff Sember approached Sydney Development Corporation, who agreed to publish Evolution in 1982. Distinctive Software was the predecessor to EA Canada.

Distinctive Software was best known in the late 1980s for their ports, racing and sports games, including the Test Drive series and Stunts.

DSI also made sports games like 4D Boxing, and the second title in the Hardball series, Hardball II.

In 1991, DSI was acquired by Electronic Arts in a deal worth US$10 million and became EA Canada.

Trade-named as Unlimited Software, Inc., and lawsuit
In 1989, programmers Pete Gardner and the "Old Kid" (Amory Wong) of DSI, under the pseudonym USI (Unlimited Software, Inc.), converted Sega's arcade game Out Run into a DOS version. For Out Run, they used several software libraries they had developed for Test Drive II. Consequently, Accolade charged that DSI violated a working agreement, and sued. Accolade sought a preliminary injunction against the distribution and sale of Out Run. Distinctive Software argued that it had only used source code that did routine functions, such as clearing the video screen and that Accolade did not own a copyright on those functions. Accolade argued that their contract for Test Drive II gave them the ownership and copyright of the final product—the game—and the source code used to create it. Distinctive Software won; the court ruled that "the licensing agreement transfers to Accolade the copyright to the concept and design of the video game but not the underlying source code." The court also found that Accolade had failed to demonstrate that the balance of hardships was in its favor.

Notable games

References

External links

Electronic Arts
Video game development companies
Video game companies established in 1982
Video game companies disestablished in 1991
Defunct video game companies of Canada
Companies based in Burnaby
Defunct companies of British Columbia
1982 establishments in British Columbia
1991 disestablishments in British Columbia
Canadian companies established in 1982
Canadian companies disestablished in 1991